Gedye is an English surname. Notable people with the surname include:

George Eric Rowe Gedye (1890-1970), British journalist, author and intelligence officer
Graham Gedye (1929–2014), New Zealand Test cricketer 
Mary Gedye (1834-1876), Australian watercolourist and Landscape painter
Charles Townsend Gedye (1833-1900), 19th Century Australian shipping magnate

English-language surnames